Louisiana Department of Education (LADOE) is a state agency of Louisiana, United States. It manages the state's school districts. It is headquartered in the Claiborne Building at 1201 North 3rd Street in Baton Rouge. On a previous occasion the department was headquartered at 626 North 4th Street in Baton Rouge.

See also

 Louisiana Board of Elementary and Secondary Education

References

External links
 Louisiana Department of Education
 
 EducateNow! website

Public education in Louisiana
Education, Department of
State departments of education of the United States